These are the ATP Challenger Tour doubles matches for the 2014 Trofeo Ricardo Delgado Aray.

Marcelo Arévalo and Sergio Galdós were the defending champions but Galdós did not participate that year and Arévalo played alongside Cesar Ramirez and lost in the semi-finals to Chase Buchanan and Peter Polansky.

Chase Buchanan and Peter Polansky won the title, defeating Luis David Martínez and Eduardo Struvay in the final, 6–4, 6–4.

Seeds

  Marcelo Arévalo /  Cesar Ramirez (semifinals)
  Guido Andreozzi /  Facundo Argüello (first round)
  Chase Buchanan /  Peter Polansky (champions)
  Luis David Martínez /  Eduardo Struvay (final)

Draw

Draw

References
 Main Draw

Trofeo Ricardo Delgado Aray – Doubles
2014 Doubles